Laura Conz Dall'Ora (born 1 September 1962) is an Italian equestrian. She competed in two events at the 1992 Summer Olympics.

References

External links
 

1962 births
Living people
Italian female equestrians
Italian dressage riders
Olympic equestrians of Italy
Equestrians at the 1992 Summer Olympics
Sportspeople from Milan